TX-Sector is a pinball machine designed by John Trudeau and released by Gottlieb in 1988. The game features a scifi theme and revolves around raising the energy level to teleport the ball.

Description
TX-Sector was one of only three pinball machines to use a Vitrigraph playfield besides the games Victory and Diamond Lady.

The pinball machine creates the illusion of teleporting the ball by so-called staged balls that are hidden and released when needed.

The game was praised in a review by Classic Game Room for its music and sound effects, which raised the machine's market value.

Design team
 Game Design: John Trudeau
 Software: John Buras
 Artwork: Constantino Mitchell, Jeanine Mitchell
 Sound: Dave Zabriskie
 Music: Dave Zabriskie

Game quotes
 "Lock enabled"
 "Interlink disabled"
 "Power drain"
 “TX tx tx tx…”
 "Release enabled"
 "Entering transphazer"

Digital versions
TX-Sector is available as a licensed table on The Pinball Arcade for PC & Android since May 2016. This table is also available for PlayStation 3 and 4 since October 18, 2016. This table is also available on the Pinball Arcade on the Nintendo Switch.

References

External links
 Internet Pinball Database entry for TX-Sector

1988 pinball machines
Gottlieb pinball machines